Marc Cardona Rovira (born 8 July 1995) is a Spanish professional footballer who plays as a striker for Las Palmas.

Club career
Born in Lleida, Catalonia, Cardona moved to the Province of Cádiz at early age, and represented Atlético Sanluqueño CF, Xerez CD and San Benito CF as a youth. In 2014, he returned to Sanluqueño, and made his debut for the club on 24 August 2014 by coming on as a second half substitute in a 0–3 Tercera División away loss against CD Alcalá.

Cardona appeared rarely for the first team during his first season, playing regularly with the reserves in Primera Andaluza. In his second, he was a key player in Sanluqueño's promotion to Segunda División B, scoring a career-best 20 goals; highlights included a hat-trick in a 5–1 home rout of Sevilla FC C on 24 January 2016.

On 29 June 2016, Cardona joined FC Barcelona, and was immediately assigned to the reserves in the third division. He made his debut for Barça B on 20 August, scoring a hat-trick in a 3–1 home win against Atlético Saguntino.

Cardona helped the B-side achieve promotion to Segunda División in 2017 by scoring 15 goals. He played his first match in the second division on 19 August of that year, starting and scoring his team's second in a 2–1 away win against Real Valladolid.

On 19 July 2018, Cardona was loaned to La Liga side SD Eibar for one year, with a buyout clause. On 31 August he played and scored the equalizer in a 2–1 home win against Real Sociedad.

On 25 June 2019, Cardona joined fellow top tier side CA Osasuna until 2023. On 5 October of the following year, he moved to second division side RCD Mallorca on loan for one year.

On 29 July 2021, Cardona moved abroad for the first time in his career, after agreeing to a one-year loan deal with Dutch Eredivisie side Go Ahead Eagles.

On 7 July 2022, Cardona signed a two-year contract with UD Las Palmas in the second level.

Career statistics

Honours
Barcelona
Copa del Rey: 2016–17

References

External links
FC Barcelona official profile

1995 births
Living people
Sportspeople from Lleida
Spanish footballers
Footballers from Catalonia
Association football forwards
La Liga players
Segunda División players
Segunda División B players
Tercera División players
Divisiones Regionales de Fútbol players
Atlético Sanluqueño CF players
FC Barcelona Atlètic players
FC Barcelona players
SD Eibar footballers
CA Osasuna players
RCD Mallorca players
Eredivisie players
Go Ahead Eagles players
UD Las Palmas players
Catalonia international footballers
Spanish expatriate footballers
Spanish expatriate sportspeople in the Netherlands
Expatriate footballers in the Netherlands